Himala (English: Miracle) is a 1982 Filipino film directed by Ishmael Bernal and produced by the Experimental Cinema of the Philippines. It stars Nora Aunor as a young woman living in the province who claims to have seen a Marian apparition. The script by Ricky Lee was inspired a series of alleged Marian apparitions appearing before schoolgirls, which took place from 1966 to 1972 on Cabra Island in Lubang, Occidental Mindoro.

The film premiered at the 1982 Metro Manila Film Festival, where it won Best Film and Best Actress for Aunor, among other awards. It then became the first Filipino film to be included in the Competition section of the Berlin International Film Festival. In 2012, on its 30th anniversary, Himala became the first film to be restored as part of the ABS-CBN Film Restoration Project, with a premier at the 69th Venice International Film Festival as part of the Venice Classics section.

Although its initial release gave rave reviews, Himala is widely considered one of the greatest Filipino films of all time. Nora Aunor garnered worldwide popularity and is best known for her performance in the film as the purported seer and healer Elsa. Her portrayal is considered by most Filipino critics as the best of her career. On November 11, 2008, Himala won the Viewer's Choice Award for the Best Film of All Time from the Asia-Pacific Region in the 2008 CNN Asia Pacific Screen Awards beating nine other films voted by thousands of film fans around the world. The ten finalists were chosen by critics, industry insiders and actors.

Plot
The setting is a small town named Cupang, a community set in an arid landscape. The townsfolk believed that the ongoing drought was a curse placed upon them for driving away a leper some years before.

During a solar eclipse, a local girl named Elsa (Aunor), reports seeing an apparition of the Blessed Virgin Mary near a tree atop the barren hill where her adoptive mother Aling Salíng (Labalan) found her as a baby. Elsa soon after engages in faith healing the local residents. She is assisted by her friends Chayong (Centeno), Sepa (Quiambao), and Baldo (Almeda) who eventually became part of her "Seven Apostles", which later includes the entrepreneur Mrs. Alba (Palileo). Word spreads, drawing pilgrims and the curious to Cupang and Elsa's house, which is marked with a large banner proclaiming "Elsa Loves You". At the same time, enterprising residents of Cupang begin selling religious articles, offering accommodation–all capitalising on the sudden influx of local and foreign patients and tourists.

A Manila-based filmmaker named Orly (Manikan) arrives in town to make a documentary on Elsa, interviewing her and the people who personally know her. Around the same time, Elsa's childhood friend Nimia (Dueñas), now a prostitute, has returned to Cupang. Nimia establishes a kabaret (nightclub/brothel) for tourists, which is later ordered closed by Elsa's Seven Apostles.

One day, Orly approaches the town's vicar (Lamangan) in the local church's confessional. He tells the priest that he saw two drugged youths from Manila raping Elsa and Chayong on the hill of the apparitions. Orly tries to unburden himself of his tremendous guilt.

A cholera epidemic spreads throughout Cupang, with Sepa's two children dying after eating tainted meat. A still-traumatised Chayong then hangs herself out of shame following the rape. As the townsfolk bring the three bodies to the graveyard, a fourth coffin follows; the deceased's mother chastises Elsa, accusing the seer of failing to heal her child. Authorities quarantine Elsa's house, closing it off from would-be patients, while Elsa blames herself for all of the deaths and decided to stop healing. Eventually, the pilgrims and tourists stop coming, returning the town to its sleepy state.

Elsa is seen throwing up from morning sickness, indicating her pregnancy from the rape. Mrs. Alba erroneously concluded that it is an "Immaculate Conception" (when she really meant the Virgin birth), and then declares it proof of Elsa's sanctity. At that exact moment, thunder roars from the skies, followed by a sudden downpour. The townspeople rejoice, convinced that the miracle has returned and that the curse has finally been lifted. Mrs. Alba and the crowd rush to Elsa's house and called out to her while dancing in the rain. Elsa emerges at her window, and commands her devotees to assemble the townsfolk and pilgrims on the hill.

Speaking in front of an eager crowd, an initially apprehensive Elsa confesses that there were no miracles, no sightings of the Virgin, and that it is man who invents gods, miracles, and curses. In the middle of her passionate speech, a gun is fired at Elsa, mortally wounding her. A violent stampede ensues, with the old, the children, and the infirm being injured or killed in the mass hysteria.

Ensconced in her mother Salíng's arms, Elsa takes her last breath as she gazes at the sky as Orly and the media film her final moments. Baldo announces Elsa's death, eliciting wailing and weeping from the people who then rush towards the makeshift stage. To convey Elsa's corpse into a waiting ambulance, her followers lift her lifeless body–lying as though she was crucified–above the heads of the crowd clambering to touch her. People scamper all over the hill to follow Elsa's ambulance as it speeds away. Against her husband's will, Sepa addresses the crowd, proclaiming Elsa a martyr whose devotion to the Virgin must continue. Sepa and the congregation then fall on their knees and creep up the hill while repeatedly reciting the Hail Mary.

Cast

Production

Pre-production
Ricky Lee began to write the script for Himala in 1976 under director, Mike de Leon. Ricky Lee (although requested to be uncredited), Gil Quito and Doy del Mundo together co-written Itim. Quito told Lee, about a female faith healer he and a friend visited in Malolos, Bulacan. The faith healer was cured of cancer by another faith healer, leading her to be a faith healer herself. She insists that medicine is just as good as the faith of people, but soon her cancer came back and eventually took her life. This intrigued Lee, enough so that he began to think about writing a story revolving around a faith healer, and soon he and Quito visited another faith healer in Tondo, Manila. While they were visiting, Lee and Quito remembered the story of eleven-year-old Belinda Villas, who was living on Cabra Island in Lubang, Occidental Mindoro. In 1966, she and several friends reportedly began experiencing visions of the Blessed Virgin Mary dressed in white and blue. As the principal seer, Villas eventually began healing people and the island experienced a boom in commerce. This became the primary inspiration for Lee's screenplay.

With the help of Bibsy Carballo, Lee approached several producers to promote the script but was rejected several times. He entered the script to a contest by the Experimental Cinema of the Philippines where it became one of the selected scripts for production. Lee was given a month to come up with the final draft and was given ₱40,000. Several aspects of the script were revised. One of the unchanged parts is the casting of Nora Aunor as Elsa.

Alternate versions
Lee came up with different endings for the script of Himala. In one version, Elsa did not die; the townsfolk gradually stopped flocking to her and she reverted to being an ordinary person. Many years later, Orly chances upon Elsa drawing water from an old well, having fallen into obscurity along with her "miracle". In another ending, Elsa was resurrected, similar to Jesus Christ. In the end and the beginning, Elsa's devotees are depicted awaiting her return to continue healing the sick townsfolk.

Development
Shooting began on July 13, 1982, with the arrival of the art department in Paoay, Ilocos Norte led by production designer, Raquel Villavicencio. The production team needed a place to shoot that shall depict the main setting of the film-a barren and arid land where plants hardly grow and where the soil cracks. This is to suggest a setting where a slight rain would be considered a miracle by its inhabitants. The problem encountered by the team is the shooting took place during the rainy season in the Philippines, and the film was to premiere at the 1982 Metro Manila Film Festival. The region of Ilocos was selected as shooting location of the film after scouting locations around the country for the driest place for the shoot.

Baryo Calayab was the venue of the set which was used to depict the town of Cupang. Ten carpenters were employed to prepare the set who worked for 24/7. Around 3,000 extras were employed for the film. Director Ishmael Bernal also asked people actually inflicted by disease to portray sick people within the film.

Bernal also called for the film to be minimalist, direct to the point, and "straight to the soul" and discouraged unnecessary dramatic effects. For example, the characters of Elsa and Nimia stood still, with minimal gestures in the scene where they argued. The scene was focused on the dialogue.

Another key element of the film was the bare tree where the Virgin Mary supposedly appeared. The tree was against the sky on top of a hill, but it was actually transplanted to the originally barren hilltop. The production team searched for the bare tree among green leafy trees near the area. The tree used in the production was discovered to be a hibiscus tree after it began to sprout leaves.

For the final scene in Suba Beach, the 3,000 extras were called to participate which were divided into eight groups. Rain fell and the August 6 shooting had to be postponed, while several of the extras fell sick. By the end of August, shooting for the final scene was finished. Eight cameras were used with one placed below a Meralco crane. 3,000 extras were still used for the scene which was done in one take. Production costs for the film grew due to delays caused by rain and in at least one occasion, a sandstorm. The shooting for the film took two months.

Subject and impact
Himala is the story of Elsa, a barrio lass whose supposed visions of the Virgin Mary change her life, turning her into an overnight sensation and causing mass hysteria in a poor, isolated northern Philippine village suffering from a drought. The film is centred on the issues of religious faith and faithlessness, morality, and truth. As Elsa, Aunor delivered the film's most iconic line in the climax:

Release 
Himala became a sleeper hit, earning ₱30 million, becoming one of the highest grossing Filipino films in the 1980s.

The film premiered at the 1982 Metro Manila Film Festival, where it swept the festival awards, including Best Picture, as well as Best Actress for Nora Aunor. It made its international premiere at the 33rd Berlin International Film Festival, becoming the first Filipino film to be included in the Competition section where it vied for the Golden Bear. It would go on to win the Bronze Hugo Award in the 1983 Chicago International Film Festival. In 1983, the film had the honor of opening the second and last iteration of the Manila International Film Festival, which was chaired by then First Lady Imelda Marcos.

Restoration 
In 2012, coinciding with the film's 30th anniversary, Himala became the first film to be restored by the ABS-CBN Film Restoration Project with Central Digital Lab. ABS-CBN Film Archives head Leo Katigbak had been looking to upgrade the network library, particularly Himala and Peque Gallaga's 1982 film Oro, Plata, Mata, when he met Central Digital Lab head Maynet Dayrit who also had an interest in specifically restoring Himala. The restoration took 700 hours of manual work. The digitally restored version of the Himala premiered at the 69th Venice International Film Festival as part of the Venice Classics section before being released in Philippine cinemas.

Reception
Himala has won numerous awards and distinctions in the Philippines and abroad, including Best Picture from the 1982 Metro Manila Film Festival and the 1983 Catholic Mass Media Awards.

At the Metro Manila Film Festival, the film swept nine of the eleven awards available. Aunor won the Best Actress award for her role in the film, and was nominated for other top acting awards in the Philippines. She was nominated for Best Actress at the 33rd Berlin International Film Festival, where Himala vied in the prestigious competition for the Golden Bear Award. The film was personally handpicked by Festival Director Moritz de Hadeln in the official selection.

The film's international honors also included the Bronze Hugo prize at the 1983 Chicago International Film Festival; it received a special religious citation in the 1983 Asia-Pacific Film Festival held in Taipei, Taiwan; and it was selected as the opening film for the 1983 Manila International Film Festival.

Legacy 
Himala was adjudged by the Manunuri ng Pelikulang Pilipino as one of the Ten Best Films of the Decade, and is now considered one of the greatest Filipino films of all time.

In 2022, the film's leading actress Nora Aunor was hailed as a National Artist of the Philippines, with the Film Development Council of the Philippines citing her career in depicting the "everyday realities and aspirations" of Filipinos in important films such as Himala. That same year, the film's screenwriter Ricky Lee was also named a National Artist of the Philippines. In 2001, the film's director, Ishmael Bernal, had been posthumously conferred the same honor as a National Artist of the Philippines, with Himala cited as one of his notable films.

The film was given the Viewers Choice Award for Best Asia-Pacific Film of All Time, the awarding a joint production of CNN International and the Asia Pacific Screen Awards in 2008. It received 32 percent of the viewer votes, ahead of Akira Kurosawa's 1954 epic film Seven Samurai and Ang Lee's 2000 wuxia film Crouching Tiger, Hidden Dragon, which were second and third, respectively. Himala was the only Filipino film to make the shortlist, with CNN International citing it for its "austere camera work, haunting score and accomplished performances [that] sensitively portray the harsh social and cultural conditions that people in the third world endure."

Accolades

Adaptations
In 2003, the film's original screenwriter Ricky Lee, with composer Vincent de Jesus, adapted the film into the musical Himala: Isang Musikal. De Jesus recalled watching the film as a teenager and feeling unsettled "because it showed how good people go wrong, how blind faith deludes the most loyal believers." It was staged at the Cultural Center of the Philippines by their resident theater company Tanghalang Pilipino in 2003 and then again in 2004. The adaptation won Aliw Awards for its director Soxie Topacio, as well as actress May Bayot who played the lead role of Elsa. In 2008, the musical adaptation was presented at the Asian Contemporary Theater Festival as representative of the Philippines, the first in the festival's history.

For the musical adaptation's 10th anniversary, it was produced as a dramatized concert by the Philippine Educational Theater Association with most of the original cast, including Aliw Award-winning Bayot reprising the role of Elsa, and the original artistic staff. In 2018, the musical was restaged by 9 Works Theatrical and The Sandbox Collective at the Power Mac Center Spotlight Theater in Circuit Makati under the direction of Ed Lacson Jr., starring Aicelle Santos as Elsa and Bituin Escalante as Aling Saling. The production swept the Gawad Buhay Awards, including acting awards for Santos and Escalante, and was restaged by the same production company the following year due to popular demand.

The two-act musical generally follows the plot of the film, with the lyrics of the final song "Walang Himala (The Miracle Was a Lie)" retaining the original text of Elsa's speech from the film. In the musical adaptation, however, the character of Elsa is more active in the making of her own myth as opposed to an almost passive participant as depicted in the film.

References

External links

Himala Ngayon [Documentary] at YouTube

1982 drama films
1982 films
Films directed by Ishmael Bernal
Films shot in Ilocos Norte
Star Cinema drama films
Star Cinema films
Tagalog-language films
Films critical of the Catholic Church
Philippine drama films
Marian apparitions in film
1980s English-language films
Films about faith healing